Marizapa is a town in the state of Miranda, Venezuela. It is part of the Acevedo Municipality.

Populated places in Miranda (state)